The Babuissi are an ethnic group of Gabon and the Republic of the Congo. Linguistically part of the Eshira, they live mostly in the upper basin of the Nyanga River.

Ethnic groups in Gabon
Ethnic groups in the Republic of the Congo